A total lunar eclipse took place on Wednesday, April 13, 1949, the first of two lunar eclipses in 1949.

Visibility

Related lunar eclipses

Lunar year series

See also
List of lunar eclipses
List of 20th-century lunar eclipses

Notes

External links

1949-04
1949 in science
Central total lunar eclipses